"More Than a Lover" is a song recorded by Welsh singer Bonnie Tyler from her debut studio album The World Starts Tonight (1977). It was released by RCA Records in January 1977, shortly before the release of the album, and was written by her at-the-time producers Ronnie Scott and Steve Wolfe.

The song was Tyler's third single in her career and second charting single, following "Lost in France" (1976). Its highest chart placing was number 7 in South Africa, and it also made the UK Top 30. Music critics praised Tyler for recording a song that could be seen as controversial.

Background and release 
Tyler's previous hit single "Lost in France" became a European hit single, and was due to be released in the United States when "More Than a Lover" was due for a European release. In December 1976, Tyler informed Record Mirror that her follow-up single to "Lost in France" would be "much more gutsy". The World Starts Tonight was aimed at a February/March release in 1977, and "More Than a Lover" was released one month ahead of the album.

Critical reception 
Record Mirror described the song as "more meaty" than "Lost in France", but didn't think the song was as commercial as its predecessor. Similarly, The Sydney Morning Herald described the song as the "next most commercial song to "Lost in France"."

Live performances
Tyler performed "More Than a Lover" live on Top of the Pops on 31 March 1977.

Chart performance 
The song progressed slowly in the charts; it was released in January 1977, but it took until March for the single to reach the UK Top 50. Further success was hampered when the BBC banned the song from being played on any associated music programs due to a BBC producer's view that the song contained sexual innuendos. Its highest UK chart placing was number 27, though it was a top 10 in South Africa.

Charts

Track listings
7" single
"More Than a Lover" – 4:25
"Love Tangle" – 3:15

References

1977 songs
Bonnie Tyler songs
Songs written by Ronnie Scott (songwriter)
Songs written by Steve Wolfe